Hah Man is a studio album released in 1994 by the Washington, D.C.-based go-go musician Chuck Brown. The album consists go-go renditions of classic jazz and swing songs performed with a go-go beat. The album's title track "Hah Man" was used as the theme song to the television show The Sinbad Show, a 1993-1994 black sitcom starring comedian Sinbad.

Track listing

Personnel
 Chuck Brown - lead vocal, lead guitar
 Glenn Ellis - bass guitar
 Rick Wellman - drums
 Louie Oxley - keyboards
 Leigh Pilzer - tenor saxophone
 Doug Elliott - trombone
 Chris Walker - trumpet
 Kent Wood - percussion, keyboards

See also
 The Sinbad Show

References

External links
 Hah Man at Discogs

1994 albums
Chuck Brown albums
Jazz-funk albums